Richard Schallert (born 21 April 1964 in Brand in Vorarlberg) is an Austrian former ski jumper who competed from 1982 to 1988.

He won a bronze medal in the team large hill event at the 1987 FIS Nordic World Ski Championships in Oberstdorf. Schallert finished 5th in the FIS Ski-Flying World Championships 1983 had his best individual career finish of 2nd in the normal hill in Strbske Pleso in 1985.

In 1989 he became a coach in the Austrian Ski Federation. In 2006 he took over as national team coach of the Czech Republic

External links

1964 births
Living people
Austrian male ski jumpers
Austrian ski jumping coaches
FIS Nordic World Ski Championships medalists in ski jumping
People from Bludenz District
Sportspeople from Vorarlberg
20th-century Austrian people